The men's épée was one of seven fencing events on the Fencing at the 1924 Summer Olympics programme. It was the sixth appearance of the event, which had not been on the programme in 1896. The competition was held from Wednesday, July 10, 1924 to Thursday, July 11, 1924. 67 fencers from 18 nations competed. Nations were limited to four competitors each. The event was won by Charles Delporte of Belgium, the nation's second victory in the individual épée (matching France and Cuba for most among nations). Silver went to Roger Ducret of France. Nils Hellsten earned Sweden's first medal in the event with his bronze.

Background

This was the sixth appearance of the event, which was not held at the first Games in 1896 (with only foil and sabre events held) but has been held at every Summer Olympics since 1900.

Four of the 12 finalists from the 1920 Games returned: gold medalist Armand Massard of France, fourth-place finisher Ernest Gevers of Belgium, ninth-place finisher Gustaf Lindblom of Sweden, and tenth-place finisher Charles Delporte of Belgium. Of the first three World Champions since that event started in 1921, two were present: 1922 champion Raoul Heide of Norway and 1923 (reigning) champion Wouter Brouwer of the Netherlands. (1921 winner Lucien Gaudin competed on the French team in the team event, but was not one of the four fencers in the individual event.) 

Uruguay made its debut in the event. Belgium, Great Britain, and the United States each appeared for the fifth time, tied for most among nations.

Competition format

The competition was held over four rounds. In each round, each pool held a round-robin, with bouts to 1 touch. Double-touches counted as touches against both fencers. The format returned to using barrages to separate fencers tied in the advancement spot (as had been done in 1908), rather than using head-to-head results of bouts already fenced were used (as in 1912 and 1920). The size of the pools remained at the relatively large levels introduced in 1920, with the final and semifinals consisting of 12 fencers each.

 First round: 7 pools of between 9 and 10 fencers each. The 6 fencers in each pool with the most wins advanced to the quarterfinals.
 Second round: 4 pools of 10 or 11 fencers each. The 6 fencers in each pool with the most wins advanced to the semifinals. 
 Semifinals: 2 pools of 12 fencers each. The 6 fencers in each pool with the most wins advanced to the final.
 Final: 1 pool of 12 fencers.

Schedule

Results

Round 1

The top six fencers, by number of wins, in each pool advanced. Double-losses were allowed. Tie-breakers were held within a group tied on a number of wins that broke between qualification and non-qualification.

Pool A

 Barrage

Pool B

 Barrage

Pool C

 Barrage

Pool D

Pool E

 Barrage

Pool F

Pool G

 Barrage

Quarterfinals

The top six fencers, by number of wins, in each pool advanced. Double-losses were allowed. Tie-breakers were held within a group tied on a number of wins that broke between qualification and non-qualification.

Quarterfinal A

Quarterfinal B

Quarterfinal C

 Barrage

Quarterfinal D

 Barrage

Semifinals

The top six fencers, by number of wins, in each pool advanced. Double-losses were allowed. Tie-breakers were held within a group tied on a number of wins that broke between qualification and non-qualification.

Semifinal A

Semifinal B

 Barrage

Final

Double-losses were allowed. Tie-breakers were held within a group as necessary for individual placing to sixth place; this required two rounds of tie-breakers (the first round for 2nd-5th; the second round for 2nd/3rd and 4th/5th).

 First barrage 

 Second barrage A

 Second barrage B

Results summary

References

 
 

Epee men
Men's events at the 1924 Summer Olympics